V539 Arae (Bayer designation Nu Arae (ν Arae / ν Ara)) is a triple star system in the southern constellation of Ara.

The core members of this system, ν Ara AB, consist of a pair of B-type main-sequence stars in a close orbit with a period of 3.169 days and an eccentricity of 0.06. Their respective stellar classifications are B2 V and B3 V, and they have a combined visual magnitude of 5.65. Because the orbital plane lies close to the line of sight from the Earth, this pair form a detached eclipsing binary of the Algol type. The eclipse of the primary causes a decrease of 0.52 in magnitude, while the secondary eclipse decreases the magnitude by 0.43. At an angular separation of 12.34 arcseconds, is the tertiary component of this system; a magnitude 9.40 A-type main-sequence star with a classification of A1 V.

The system is sometimes referred as Upsilon Arae (υ Arae), and more generally unlettered.

References

External links
 VizieR Detailed Page: HR 6622
 AladinPreviewer: Image of Nu Arae

Algol variables
Ara (constellation)
B-type main-sequence stars
Arae, Nu1
161783
087314
6622
Arae, V539
Spectroscopic binaries
Triple star systems
Slowly pulsating B stars
Durchmusterung objects